Apiforol is a chemical compound belonging to the flavan-4ol class of flavonoids.

Metabolism
Flavanone 4-reductase is an enzyme transforming naringenin into apiforol. This enzyme can be found in Columnea hybrida, in Malus domestica, in Pyrus communis, in Sinningia cardinalis, and in Zea mays.

References

Flavan-4-ols
Resorcinols